Neelesh B. Mehta is an Indian communications engineer, inventor and a professor at the Department of Electrical and Communications Engineering of the Indian Institute of Science who studies wireless networks.

Biography 

Neelesh Mehtha was born on 9 January 1975. He won the Indian National Mathematical Olympiad at the state level in 1991 and the next year, he was selected for the National Talent Search Scholarship which helped fund his undergraduate work at the Indian Institute of Technology, Madras from 1992 to 1996.  He earned his MS in engineering in 1997 from California Institute of Technology and won the AT&T World Leadership Award in the process. He continued at the institution for his doctoral studies under the guidance of Andrea Goldsmith  of Stanford University and after securing a PhD in electrical engineering in 2000, he started his career in 2001 as a research scientist at AT&T Labs.

Mehta's stay in the US would last till 2007 during which period, he also worked with Broadcom (2002–03) and Mitsubishi Electric Research Laboratories (2003–07). He returned to India in September 2007 to take up the position of an assistant professor at the Electrical Communication Engineering Department of the Indian Institute of Science where he was appointed associate professor since 2011. His has focused on energy harvesting wireless networks, interference modeling and co-operative communications, with special focus on the design, invention, and performance analysis of various technologies.

Mehta is a former member-at-large of the IEEE Communications Society (2014–15) and served as the director of corporate publications during 2012–13. He has been associated with three of its journals, IEEE Transactions on Communications, IEEE Wireless Communication Letters and IEEE Transactions on Wireless Communications, serving as the executive editor of the last mentioned.

Awards and honors 
Mehta received the Young Engineer Award of the Indian National Academy of Engineering in 2010. The National Academy of Sciences, India elected him as a fellow in 2013; a year later the academy would honor him again with the 2014 NASI-Scopus Young Scientist award. The same year, the Department of Science and Technology selected him for the Swarnajayanti Fellowship, the tenure of the fellowship running until 2019. He became an elected fellow of the Indian National Academy of Engineering in 2015 and a Featured Engineer of EE Times, the next year. He received one more award in 2016 in the form of Hari Om Ashram Prerit Vikram Sarabhai Research Award of Physical Research Laboratory. The Council of Scientific and Industrial Research awarded him the Shanti Swarup Bhatnagar Prize, one of the highest Indian science awards in 2017.

Selected bibliography

Chapters

Articles

See also 
 3GPP
 E-UTRA
 LTE
 Radio propagation model

References

External links 
 

Recipients of the Shanti Swarup Bhatnagar Award in Engineering Science
Indian scientific authors
1975 births
Living people
Engineers from Karnataka
IIT Madras alumni
California Institute of Technology alumni
Academic staff of the Indian Institute of Science
AT&T people
Mitsubishi Electric people
Fellows of the Indian National Academy of Engineering
Fellows of The National Academy of Sciences, India
20th-century Indian inventors
Indian patent holders
21st-century Indian inventors